Aldersgate College is a private college located in Solano, Nueva Vizcaya, Philippines.

History 
Aldersgate College was founded in 1965 by Methodist leaders Pilar D. Galima and Froilan B. Calata.  The college, which opened as a church school under the jurisdiction of the Northern Philippines Annual Conference of The United Methodist Church, was incorporated in 1970.

The school was named after a street in London where John Wesley, the founder of Methodism, had a pivotal spiritual experience.

The college offers programs in basic education, along with programs at both the undergraduate and graduate levels.  Aldersgate College currently consists of seven colleges: 
The Graduate School (GS)
The College of Business and Technology (CBIT)
The College of Arts, Sciences and Education (CASE)
The College of Engineering and Technology (CET)
The School of Medical Sciences (SMS)
The School of Criminology (SC)
The Aldersgate School of Divinity and Episcopal Area Training Center (ASD-EATC)

References 

Universities and colleges in Nueva Vizcaya
Educational institutions established in 1965
1965 establishments in the Philippines